Chernobyl is a Hasidic dynasty that was founded by Grand Rabbi Menachem Nachum Twersky, known by the name of his work as the Meor Einayim. The dynasty is named after the northern Ukrainian town of Chernobyl, where Rabbi Nachum served as the maggid. The lineage has continued to exist to this day, although not always with the name Chernobyl. Today there are several rebbes named Chernobyl. The central court is in Bnei Brak, headed by Rabbi Menachem Nachum Twersky.

The name "Chernobyl dynasty" is also used as a general term for the sects of the descendants of Rabbi Mordechai of Chernobyl; the dynasties of Chernobyl, Skver, Trisk, Rachmastrivka, Hornosteipel, and in the past even the dynasties of Machnovka (today this court practices Belz customary), Makarov and Shpikov and the dynasties that branched out of these dynasties.

Lineage of the Chernobyl rebbes 
 Rabbi Menachem Nachum of Chernobyl, founder of the dynasty, was a disciple of the Baal Shem Tov (the founder of the Hasidic movement) and of the Maggid of Mezritch, and author of the books Me'or Einayim and Yesamach Lev. His father was Rabbi Zvi Hirsch son of Rabbi Nachum Gaon of Narinsk. He served as a Maggid Meisharim in the communities of Narynsk, Pogrebishti and Chernobyl, and was poor most of his life. He died on the 11th of Cheshvan 1798.
 Rabbi Mordechai Twersky of Chernobyl, known as the Maggid of Chernobyl, was the son of Rabbi Menachem Nachum and Sarah. He was married to the daughter of Rabbi Aharon the Great of Karlin and a second time to Feiga, the daughter of Rabbi Dovid Leikas. He used to turn around in the towns and receive Maggidus letters from many of them. Unlike his father, he was rich and traveled in a horse-drawn carriage. His teachings were gathered in the book Likutei Torah. He died on 24 May 1837, and was buried in Ignatowka, near Kiev, and left eight sons and three daughters.
 Rabbi Aaron Twersky of Chernobyl, the son of Rabbi Mordechai and Chaya Sara. He was born in 1784, and his name was given to him after his grandfather, Rabbi Aharon the Great of Karlin, and in his youth his father forced him to serve as rebbe, and since then a he traveled a lot through the surrounding cities. Upon the death of his father, he took his place in the leadership of his community and the Maggiding of Chernobyl and other communities. He died on 21 November 1871, leaving behind six children. His sons were born from his second wife.

The Chernobyl dynasty

The founder of the Chernobyl dynasty was Rebbe (Menachem) Nochum, the Meor Einayim, a disciple of Rabbi Yisroel ben Eliezer, the Baal Shem Tov, who established the Hasidic movement. He was also a disciple of the Maggid of Mezritch:

Grand Rabbi Menachem Nochum Twersky of Chernobyl (1730–1797) – author of Meor Einayim, disciple of the Baal Shem Tov
Grand Rabbi Mordechai Twersky (1770–1837) – the Chernobyler Maggid, son of the Meor Einayim – had eight sons who each became a rebbe and founded their own dynasty.
Grand Rabbi Aaron Twersky of Chernobyl (1784–1871), eldest son of Rebbe Mordechai
Grand Rabbi Yeshaya Meshulom Zishe Twersky of Chernobyl (1814–1881), son of Rebbe Aaron
Grand Rabbi Shlomo BenZion Twersky of Chernobyl (1870–1939), son of Rebbe Yeshayo Meshulom Zishe
Grand Rabbi Boruch Osher Twersky of Chernobyl (d. 1905), son of Rebbe Aaron
Grand Rabbi Shlomo Shmuel Twersky of Chernobyl-Brooklyn (d.1936), son of Rebbe Boruch Osher and son-in-law of Rebbe Yeshaya Meshulom Zishe
Grand Rabbi Yaakov Yisroel Twersky, Chernobyler Rebbe of Boro Park (1902–1983), son of Rebbe Shlomo Shmuel – the last Chernobyler Rebbe who was born in Chernobyl
 Rabbi Shlomo Twersky (d. 2017), son of Grand Rabbi Yaakov Yisroel Twersky, Rabbi of Kehal Chasidy Chernobel in Lawrence, New York;
 Grand Rabbi Zvi Twersky – Rosh Yeshiva of Yeshivas Toras Chaim in Romema, Jerusalem, son of Rabbi Shlomo Twersky of Lawrence, NY;
 Grand Rabbi Menachem Nochum Twerski of Loiev, son of Rebbe Aaron
 Grand Rabbi Mordechai Twerski of Loiev (1840–1905), son of Rebbe Menachem Nochum
 Grand Rabbi Avrohom Yehoshua Heshl Twerski of Loiev-Tshudnov (1860–1914), son of Rebbe Mordechai of Loiev
 Grand Rabbi Chaim Yitzchak Twerski of Loiev-Kiev (1886–1943), son of Rebbe Avrohom Yehoshua Heshl of Loiev-Tshudnov. 
 Grand Rabbi Meshulam Zusha Twerski (1917–1987), Chernobyl-Loiev Rebbe of Bnei Brak, son of Rebbe Chaim Yitzchak of Loiev-Kiev. 
 Grand Rabbi Menachem Nachum Twerski (b. 1942),  Chernobyl-Loiev Rebbe of Bnei Brak, son of Rebbe Meshulam Zusha of Chernobyl-Loiev. 
 Grand Rabbi Yeshaya Twerski (b. 1944), Chernobyl-Loiev Rebbe of Boro Park, son of Rebbe Meshulam Zusha of Chernobyl-Loiev. 
 Grand Rabbi Boruch Bentsion Twerski of Loiev-Uman (1875–1945), son of Rebbe Mordechai of Loiev
 Rabbi Chaim Mordechai Twersky (1921-2013), Chernobyler Rav of Boro Park and Rabbi of Maimonides Hospital Brooklyn New York, grandson of Rabbi Boruch Bentsion of Loiev-Uman
 Rabbi Baruch Benzion Twersky, Chernobyler Rav of Monsey, son of Rabbi Chaim Mordechai of Boro Park
Grand Rabbi Yaakov Yisroel Twersky of Cherkas, (1794–1876) – son of the Maggid of Chernobyl 
Rebbe Mordechai Dov Twerski of Hornosteipel (1839–1903), author of "Emek Sheilah" and four other soforim– grandson of the Rebbe Yaakov Yisroel Twerski and great-great-grandson of Rebbe Zishe of Anipoli.
Rebbe Chaim Moshe Tzvi Twerski of Hornosteipel-Rachmastrivka (1866–1933) - son of the Rebbe Mordechai Dov. Son in law of Rebbe Nuchum of Rachmastrivka of the Chernobal dynasty 
Rebbe Ben Tzion Yehuda Leib Twerski  of Hornosteipel-USA (1867–1951) – son of Rebbe Mordechai Dov.
Rabbi Chaim Aharon Twerski – son of Rebbe Ben Tzion Yehuda Leib - son-in-law of Rebbe Yaakov Yisroel Dovid Hager of Strozhnits
Rabbi Menachem Nuchim Twerski son of Rebbe Ben Tzion Yehuda Leib (d. 19 Kislev)– son of Rebbe Ben Tzion Yehuda Leib - son-in-law of Rebbe Yosef Zvi Kalish of Skernovitz-Bnei Braq [Vorka Hasidic Dynasty]was a very knowledgeable in torah and chassidus. Young and old would flock to his shul in Tel-Aviv and hear words of Torah and stories of tzadddikim.  He wrote a sefer called "Medor L'dor" documenting his pedigree charts, Yichus book and the biography of his ancestors.
Rebbe Yaakov Yisroel  Twerski of Hornosteipel-Milwaukee (1900–1973)  - son and successor of Rebbe Ben Tzion Yehuda Leib - son-in-law of Rebbe Benzion Halberstam of Bobov
Rebbe Ben Tzion Chaim Shloime Meshulam Zusia Twerski of Hornosteipel-Denver (1923–1981) - son of Rebbe Yaakov Yisroel of Milwaukee
Rebbe Mordechai Dov Ber Twerski of Hornosteipel-Denver (b. 1949), in Flatbush, Brooklyn - only son of Rebbe Shloime of Denver
Rebbe Shalom Shachna Friedman of Hornosteipel-Beitar Illit - son-in-law of Rebbe Shloime of Denver
Rebbe Mordechai Dov Ber Twerski (1924–1998), son of Rebbe Yaakov Yisroel of Milwaukee
Rabbi Dr. Abraham J. Twerski, M.D., son of Rebbe Yaakov Yisroel of Milwaukee
Rebbe Yechiel Michel Twerski of Hornosteipel-Milwaukee (b. 1939) - son of Rebbe Yaakov Yisroel of Milwaukee
Rabbi Aaron Twerski, son of Rebbe Yaakov Yisroel of Milwaukee
Grand Rabbi Yitzhak Twersky of Skver, (1812–1885) son of Rebbe Mordechai; son-in-law of Rabbi Tzvi Hirsh of Skver, a patrilineal descendant of the Baal Shem Tov;
 Grand Rabbi David (Duvidl) Twersky of Skver (1848–1919) — son of Rebbe Itzikl.
 Grand Rabbi Mordechai Twersky of Skver (1868–1919) — son of Rebbe Duvidl.
 Grand Rabbi Yitzchak Twersky of Skver (1888–1941) — arrived in America in 1923, son of Rabbi Mordechai.
 Grand Rabbi David Twersky of Skver-Boro Park (1922–2001) — son of Rabbi Yitzchak.
 Grand Rabbi Yechiel Michl Twersky — present Skverer Rebbe of Boro Park, son of Rabbi David.
 Grand Rabbi Shlomo Twersky of Skver (1870–1921) — son of Rebbe Duvidl.
 Grand Rabbi Eluzar Twersky of Faltishan-Skver (1893–1976) — Rebbe of Faltishan (Fălticeni, Romania); son of Rabbi Shlomo; arrived in America in 1947.
 Grand Rabbi Yisrael Avraham Stein of Faltishan (1915–1989) — Rabbi of Faltishan, and Faltishaner Rebbe in Brooklyn; son-in-law of Rabbi Elazar; arrived in America in 1946.
 Grand Rabbi Mordechai Stein of Faltishan — present Faltishaner Rabbe; son of Rabbi Yisrael Avraham.
 Rabbi Avrom Twersky of Faltishan (ca. 1920-1985) — Rebbe of Faltishan Borough Park; son of Rabbi Eluzer.
 Grand Rabbi Shulem Meir Twersky — Present Faltishan Borough Park Rebbe; son of Rabbi Avrom.
 Grand Rabbi Yakov Yosef Twersky of Skver (1899–1968) — Rebbe of New Square; son of Rabbi Duvid'l.
 Grand Rabbi David Twersky of Skver — present Rebbe of New Square and Grand Rabbi of the Skverer Hasidim worldwide; son of Rebbe Yaakov Yosef.
Grand Rabbi Avrohom Twersky of Trisk, son of Rebbe Mordechai, author of Mogen Avrohom (d. 1889)
Grand Rabbi David Twersky of Tolna, son of Rebbe Mordechai
Grand Rabbi Yochanan Twersky of Rachmastrivka, son of Rebbe Mordechai

Scions

Scions of the Chernobyl dynasty include:
 Grand Rabbi Menachem Nochum Twerski, the Chernobyler Rebbe of Bnei Brak;
 Grand Rabbi Yeshaya Twersky, the Chernobyler Rebbe of Borough Park, Brooklyn;
 The Chernobyler Rebbe of Ashdod;
 Grand Rabbi David Twersky, of New Square, NY, leader of Skver, the largest current Hasidic dynasty originating from Chernobyl;
 Grand Rabbi Michel Twersky, the Skverer Rebbe of Boro Park;
 Grand Rabbi Michel Twerski, the Hornosteipler Rebbe of Milwaukee;
 Grand Rabbi Mordechai Dov Ber Twerski, the Hornosteipel-Denver Rebbe of Flatbush, Brooklyn;
 Grand Rabbi Shalom Shachna Friedman, the Hornosteipler Rebbe of Jerusalem;
 Rabbi Abraham J. Twerski, author and psychiatrist;
 Rabbi Aaron Twerski, retired Dean of Hofstra Law School;
 Rabbi Dovid Twersky, the Rachmastrivka Rebbe of Jerusalem;
 Rabbi Chai Yitzchok Twersky, the Rachmastrivka Rebbe of Borough Park, Brooklyn;
 Grand Rabbi Menachem Mendel Matisyohu Twersky, the Trisker Rebbe of London;
Grand Rabbi Yitzchok Duvid Twersky of Trisk-Tolna. Son of Rabbi Menachem Mendel Matisyohu
 Rabbi Moshe Mordechai Eichenstein, the Trisker Rebbe of Jerusalem;
 Rabbi Yitzchak Menachem Weinberg, the Tolner Rebbe of Jerusalem;
 Rabbi Amitai Twersky, the Tolner Rebbe of Ashdod;
 Rabbi Chaim Eliezer Twerski, son of Reb Mottel Twerski of Flatbush, Rosh Yeshiva Hebrew Theological College and Rav of Bais Chaim Dovid Lincolnwood, Illinois;
 Rabbi Yitzhak Twersky, the Tolner Rebbe of Boston and a professor and head of the Center for Jewish Studies at Harvard University;
 Rabbi Mayer Twersky, son of Rabbi Yitzhak Twersky of Boston, Rosh Yeshiva of Rabbi Isaac Elchanon Theological Seminary of Yeshiva University;
 Rabbi Mosheh Twersky, son of Rabbi Yitzhak Twersky of Boston, Rosh Mesivta of Yeshiva Toras Moshe in Jerusalem, Israel.
 Grand Rabbi Yitzhak Aharon Korff, grandson of Rebbe Yaakov Yisroel Korff, Zvhil–Mezbuz Rebbe of Boston.

Notes

Sources

External links
 Rebbes of Makarow-Berdichev (Chernobyl Hasidic dynasty)  – site (in Russian and English) of Zalman Shklyar (Russia, Moscow, icq 277236854)
 Tolner Rebbes
 The Talnoye Interest Group
 WebCite query result
The Hornosteiple shul in Milwaukee Beth Jehudah
Chernobler Rebbe...